This is a list of notable Christian films. Titles are listed in alphabetical order followed by the year of release in parentheses. The month or day of release is stated if known.

Pre-1930

1930s

1940s

1950s

1960s

1970s

1980s

1990s

2000s

2000
Apocalypse III: Tribulation (January 14)
St. Patrick: The Irish Legend 
The Testaments of One Fold and One Shepherd (March 24)
The Miracle Maker (March 31)
Jesus (May 14)
Something to Sing About (June 10)
The Patriot (June 30)
Left Behind: The Movie (September 4)
Mercy Streets (October 31)
Joseph: King of Dreams (November 7)
Christy: Return to Cutter Gap (November 19)

2001
Carman: The Champion (March 2)
Lay It Down (April 3)
Christy: A Change of Seasons (May 13)
Megiddo: The Omega Code 2 (September 7)
Extreme Days (September 28)
The Miracle of the Cards (November 10)
Late One Night

2002
The Climb (February 22)
Amen. (February 27)
Joshua (April 19)
Jonah: A VeggieTales Movie (October 4)
Time Changer (October 25)
Left Behind II: Tribulation Force (October 29)

2003
Magnifico (January 29) 
Ben Hur (February 15)
Gods and Generals (February 21)
The Gospel of John (March 18)
Bells of Innocence (April 6)
Love Comes Softly (April 13)
The Light of the World (October 3)
Luther (October 30)
Christmas Child (November 9)
Shortcut to Happiness
Yesu Mahimalu

2004
The Passion of the Christ (February 25)
Six: The Mark Unleashed (June 29)
Saint John Bosco: Mission to Love
Love's Enduring Promise (November 20)
Father of Mercy 
Livin' It
Shanti Sandesham

2005
Birhen ng Manaoag 
The Gospel (October 7)
Left Behind: World at War (October 21)
The Perfect Stranger (October 28)
Joyeux Noël (November 9)
Into Great Silence (November 10)
Barabbas
Mulla Kireetam

2006
End of the Spear (January 20)
Hidden Places (January 28)
The Second Chance (February 17)
Prince Vladimir (February 23)
The Visitation (February 28)
God Help Me (July 13)
Unidentified (August 18)
Livin' It LA (September 1)
Jesus Camp (September 15)
Amazing Grace (September 16)
Facing the Giants (September 29)
Love's Abiding Joy (October 6)
One Night with the King (October 13)
Secret of the Cave (October 20)
Color of the Cross (October 27)
Faith Like Potatoes (October 27)
The Genius Club (October 27)
The Island (November 23)
The Nativity Story (December 1)
Nacho Libre (June 16)

2007
The Ultimate Gift (March 9)
Love's Unending Legacy (April 7)
Evan Almighty (June 22)
Noah's Ark (July 5)
Saving Sarah Cain (August 19)
St. Giuseppe Moscati: Doctor to the Poor 
The Prodigal Trilogy (October 17)
The Ten Commandments (October 19)
Noëlle (December 7)
Love's Unfolding Dream (December 15)

2008
Me & You, Us, Forever (February 15)
The Passion (March 16)
The Sound of a Dirt Road (August 18)
Fireproof (September 26)
Billy: The Early Years (October 10)
Saving God (October 18)
House (November 7)
Pilgrim's Progress: Journey to Heaven

2009
Not Easily Broken (January 9)
Song Man (February 2)
Like Dandelion Dust 
The Cross (March 27)
The One Lamb (March 30)
C Me Dance (April 3)
Love Takes Wing (April 4)
The Widow's Might (April 13)
Bringing Up Bobby (May 15)
Journey to Everest (August 20)
Click Clack Jack: A Rail Legend (September 1)
Love Finds a Home (September 5)
The Lost & Found Family (September 15)
The Secrets of Jonathan Sperry (September 18)
The Imposter (October 12)
Homeless for the Holidays (October 16)
Sarah's Choice (November 1)
To Save a Life 
The River Within (November 10)
Birdie & Bogey (November 17)
The Blind Side (November 20)
The Mysterious Islands (November)
Side Order (December 4)
The Book of Ruth: Journey of Faith (December 15)
A Greater Yes: The Story of Amy Newhouse (December 15)

2010s

2020s

Upcoming

See also
Christian film industry
List of Christian film production companies
The Bible in film
List of films based on the Bible
List of actors who have played Jesus
The Chosen (TV series)

References

Further reading
Lindvall, Terry Sanctuary Cinema: Origins of the Christian Film Industry (New York University Press, 2007) 
Lindvall, Terry and Andrew Quicke Celluloid Sermons: Emergence of the Christian Film Industry (New York University Press, 2011)

Films about Christianity
Christian